The Rover pipeline is a natural gas pipeline currently under construction in the United States. It is being constructed by Energy Transfer Partners.  When completed, it will be 713 miles long, extending from southeastern Ohio in Belmont County to southern Michigan in Livingston County. Construction began in the first quarter of 2017 and is scheduled to end November 2017. The Rover pipeline is expected to carry 3.25 billion cubic feet per day of natural gas through approximately 710 miles of 24-inch-, 30-inch-, 36-inch-, and 42-inch-wide pipeline.

In November 2017, the Ohio Attorney General filed suit against the owner and operator of the Rover pipeline (Rover Pipeline LLC) for multiple alleged failures, including illegal discharge of drilling fluids and failure to secure discharge permits. The Rover pipeline allegedly violated Ohio's water standards over a dozen times between April and September 2017.

In November 2019 Energy Transfer began protesting the tax rate they should pay for the pipeline in Ohio.

References

 Rover Pipeline Facts | About Rover

Natural gas pipelines in the United States
Energy infrastructure in Ohio
Energy infrastructure in Michigan
Natural gas pipelines in Ohio
Natural gas pipelines in Michigan